The Overmind (originally the Over-Mind) is a fictional character appearing in American comic books published by Marvel Comics.

Publication history

The character first appeared in Fantastic Four #113 (Aug 1971).

Fictional character biography
The Overmind is an alien belonging to the Eternals of Eyung. He was born uncounted millennia ago on the planet Eyung ("Eternus") as Grom. Acting as one of their warlords, he led massacres of entire species. He was also the reigning champion in their gladiatorial arenas. When his race had engaged the Gigantians in a war about to lead to mutual absolute destruction, Grom was chosen for his physical prowess as the receptacle for their entire population of several hundred million minds. He was launched in a protective capsule, unconscious for thousands of years while assimilating them into one single mind.

In recent years he awoke and piloted his ship to the nearest inhabited planet, Earth. There he came into contact with the Fantastic Four, who had been warned by Uatu the Watcher. The Overmind took over the mind of Mister Fantastic, and battled the Fantastic Four and Doctor Doom, who proved unable to stop him until the Stranger intervened and shrank the Overmind into a subatomic microverse on a dust mote, where he was left completely isolated with no available conquests, and went mad from the strain.

He was later discovered by another collective consciousness known as Null the Living Darkness. In his current broken state Null took control of him and sent him on a campaign against a parallel universe, Earth, inhabited by the Squadron Supreme. The Overmind mentally enslaved both the Squadron and that Earth's leaders while posing as the U.S. president Kyle Richmond, and began construction of an interstellar armada to invade other worlds. When Hyperion brought the Defenders to assist him, they freed the Squadron. Meanwhile, Null had leeched away the Overmind's mental energies, but yet another psychic composite entity of seven human telepaths empowered by the assembled heroes, defeated him and inhabited the weakened Grom.

The Overmind returned with the Defenders to their Earth. For a while this entity was welcomed into the Defenders' ranks, and the loose ends of the seven psychics' old lives were tied up. He assisted the Defenders in the rescue of Daimon Hellstrom from the Miracle Man. The Overmind grew uncomfortable and eventually left the Defenders, and made them forget he was ever one of them. He tried to find a purpose by attempting to help Millwood, New Hampshire, a town of 800 people dying of chemical poisoning, by controlling their minds to foster the illusion that they were well. The Overmind was convinced to cancel the illusion and allow them to live in reality.

When the Squadron transferred to this Earth, the Overmind's original psyche was stirred into awareness and absorbed the telepaths into his own billion-wide whole. His psychic powers were replenished and his true mind reasserted itself. He once more mind-controlled and kidnapped the Squadron to take revenge against the Stranger by organizing a raid against the latter's laboratory world. He freed many of the Stranger's superhuman captives to fuel his enslaved ranks. He locked the Stranger in a stalemated mental battle. When several Watchers arrived on an unrelated business the Overmind was wrought by paranoia, believing the Stranger to have summoned them for assistance, inducing psychosis, and enabling the Stranger to capture him as a subject of study.

The Overmind's future counterpart travels back in time to present-day Squadron-Earth to aid the Scarlet Centurion in repulsing the expanding Nth Man. His head explodes from the effort and he dies.

He later apparently managed to escape and declined participation in the Mad Thinker's quest for vengeance against the Fantastic Four.

Civil War
Shortly afterwards Grom was affected by the Purple Man's mind-controlling pheromones, and used to both monitor New York's population, as the latter's chemicals spread in the water supply, as well as control potential threats like the Avengers, but disappeared after the Purple Man's defeat. He was eventually located by Baron Zemo and his Thunderbolts, during the Civil War event, and coerced to join the group or face jail time.

Powers and abilities
The Overmind possesses vast psychic powers derived from the synthesized intellects of the billion Eternals of Eyung composing his essence, including telepathy, telekinesis, or illusion-casting, and can use them over great distances. The Overmind can scan the thoughts of others and project his thoughts into others' minds within an unrevealed radius. His victims are completely unaware of his influence unless he allows them. Even when severely weakened, with his mind comatose and his body under the influence of the 7 telepaths, whose assembled might was likened to a drop in the ocean compared to his own, he was able to control the minds of 800 people, and at full power he managed to push the Stranger, a cosmic entity rivaling Galactus in scope, to his mental limits. He possesses psychokinetic ability enabling him to lift psychokinetically approximately what he can physically lift.

His sole weaknesses are his inability to control Eternals of any race, and his schizoid composition can make his abilities weaken immensely when sufficiently stressed. The Overmind is susceptible to magic, the imposition of superior intellects and powers, and fatigue. Twice he suffered mental breakdowns, rendering him mentally vulnerable.

As a result of his alien physiognomy and metabolism, he possesses great superhuman physical strength, magnified sevenfold through psionic augmentation; and even more impressive speed, stamina, and durability. He is an experienced veteran of many wars, with considerable fighting skills.

Reception
 In 2021, CBR.com ranked Grom/The Over-Mind 14th in their "15 Most Powerful Eternals" list.
 In 2021, Screen Rant ranked The Over-Mind 9th in their "10 Most Powerful Members Of The Eternals" list

Notes

References

External links
Overmind at the Marvel Universe

Characters created by John Buscema
Characters created by Stan Lee
Comics characters introduced in 1971
Marvel Comics characters with superhuman strength
Marvel Comics telepaths